Denver's City and County Building is a historic building in the Denver Civic Center, in the Civic Center Historic District, built to house Denver government bureaus.

It was built in 1932, facing the Colorado State Capitol, at the west end of Civic Center Park, at 1437 Bannock Street, on land that had been home to the La Veta Place apartments, home to some of Denver's early high society members, including Louise Sneed Hill.  It is Greek Revival in style.  It was kept low in height to preserve the Capitol building's view of mountains.

See also
History of the government of Denver, Colorado

References

Government of Denver
Civic Center Historic District (Denver, Colorado)
National Register of Historic Places in Denver
Government buildings in Colorado
Government buildings on the National Register of Historic Places in Colorado
Historic district contributing properties in Colorado